Thierry Morand (born May 24, 1960), is a French entrepreneur and expert in the containment engineering field. He is known for having designed and created unique laboratories and controlled atmosphere areas for more than 30 years, in France and abroad, including four biosafety level 4 laboratories (BSL4). Morand has also improved the equipment and construction standards. His company, Clima plus, designs and manages laboratories projects.

References

External links 
 Gopura Asia web page

1960 births
Living people
French businesspeople
French engineers